Lake Wateree is a  reservoir in Kershaw, Fairfield, and Lancaster counties, South Carolina, in the United States. Developed in 1919 by the damming of the Wateree River, it is one of South Carolina's oldest man-made lakes. It has  of shoreline and includes Lake Wateree State Park, a bird refuge, and Shaw Air Force Base Recreation Center. 

It was named after the river, and both were named for the Wateree Native Americans, an historic tribe who lived in the area before European settlement. They became extinct as a tribe after European warfare and encroachment, and their descendants merged with the Catawba people.

Location
The lake is surrounded by three South Carolina counties: Kershaw, Fairfield and Lancaster. I-77 passes west of the lake, and it is accessible via SC 97.

Origin
Duke Power (now Duke Energy) dammed the Wateree River to generate hydroelectric power, and flooded a large area in 1919, creating Lake Wateree. The Wateree Hydro Station produces 56 megawatts of electricity.

Wildlife
Lake Wateree is known for its fishing and bountiful wildlife around the shoreline. The fish include Largemouth Bass, Striped bass, White Perch, White bass, Crappie, Channel catfish, Arkansas Blue Catfish, Shellcrackers, Bream.

Other wildlife in the area include deer, fox, squirrel, turtle, dove, turkey, alligator, and various species of duck, hawk, eagle, egret, Heron and osprey.

See also
Camden, South Carolina
Great Falls, South Carolina
Mitford, South Carolina
List of lakes in South Carolina

References

External links
Freshwater Fishing Regulations

Protected areas of Fairfield County, South Carolina
Protected areas of Kershaw County, South Carolina
Protected areas of Lancaster County, South Carolina
Wateree
Dams in South Carolina
Duke Energy dams
Bodies of water of Fairfield County, South Carolina
Bodies of water of Kershaw County, South Carolina
Bodies of water of Lancaster County, South Carolina
Catawba River